Luis Grajeda (21 June 1937 – 15 January 2019) was a Mexican basketball player who competed in the 1964 Summer Olympics and in the 1968 Summer Olympics.

Early life 
He was born in Mexico City.
With Mexico he played a World Cup edition (1963), two of the Olympic Games (1964 and 1968), in addition to the 1967 Panamerican Games in which he won the silver.

References

1937 births
2019 deaths
Mexican men's basketball players
1963 FIBA World Championship players
Olympic basketball players of Mexico
Basketball players at the 1964 Summer Olympics
Basketball players at the 1968 Summer Olympics
Basketball players at the 1967 Pan American Games
Basketball players from Mexico City
Pan American Games medalists in basketball
Pan American Games silver medalists for Mexico
Medalists at the 1967 Pan American Games